Thierry Berger (born 12 May 1962) is a French sailor. He competed in the Flying Dutchman event at the 1992 Summer Olympics.

References

External links
 

1962 births
Living people
French male sailors (sport)
Olympic sailors of France
Sailors at the 1992 Summer Olympics – Flying Dutchman
Sportspeople from Dijon